Bieniędzice  is a village in the administrative district of Gmina Wolanów, within Radom County, Masovian Voivodeship, in east-central  Poland.

References

Villages in Radom County